Frederick Septimus Kelly  (29 May 1881 – 13 November 1916) was an Australian and British musician and composer and a rower who competed in the 1908 Summer Olympics. After surviving the Gallipoli campaign He was killed in action in the Battle of the Somme during the First World War.

Early life
Kelly, the fourth son and seventh child of Irish-born woolbroker Thomas Hussey Kelly and his wife Mary Anne, née Dick, was born in 1881 at 47 Phillip Street, Sydney. He was educated at Sydney Grammar School, then went with his family to England and educated at Eton College, where he stroked the school eight to victory in the Ladies' Challenge Plate at Henley Royal Regatta in 1899.

Kelly studied music at Eton under Charles Harford Lloyd, and was awarded a Lewis Nettleship musical scholarship at Oxford in 1899. At Balliol College, Oxford (BA, 1903; MA, 1912) he was mentored by Donald Tovey and became president of the university musical club and a leading spirit at the Sunday evening concerts at Balliol.  He was a protégé of Ernest Walker.

Rowing
Kelly took up sculling while at Oxford and won the Diamond Challenge Sculls at Henley in 1902, beating Raymond Etherington-Smith in the final.

He rowed in the four seat for Oxford against Cambridge in the 1903 Boat Race. Oxford lost the race by 6 lengths. Kelly went on to win the Diamond sculls at Henley again that summer, beating Julius Beresford in the final. He also won the Wingfield Sculls, the Amateur Championship of the Thames, beating the holder Arthur Cloutte. This was the only occasion on which he entered.

On leaving Oxford in 1903 he starting rowing at Leander Club and was in the Leander crews which won the Grand Challenge Cup at Henley in 1903, 1904 and 1905 and the Stewards' Challenge Cup in 1906. In 1905 he again won the Diamond sculls, beating Harry Blackstaffe. His time on this occasion 8 min. 10 sec. stood as a record for over 30 years.

Kelly's last appearance in a racing boat was in 1908, when he competed at the London Olympic Games. He was a member of the Leander crew in the eights, which won the gold medal for Great Britain.

Contemporary reports of Kelly's oarsmanship were glowing: 'his natural sense of poise and rhythm made his boat a live thing under him'; 'Many think [Kelly] the greatest amateur stylist of all time'.

Hands and arms 
In 1907 Kelly became worried about problems with his hands and arms that were impeding his performance, especially as a musician. He also developed a facial tic. He sought hypnotherapeutic treatment for this condition from J. Milne Bramwell, the specialist medical hypnotist, in London. He attended Bramwell's rooms for treatment over an extended time.

Life after Oxford
After leaving Oxford with fourth-class honours in history, Kelly studied the piano under Iwan Knorr at the Hoch Conservatory in Frankfurt, alongside members of the Frankfurt Group. On his return to London in 1908 he acted as an adviser to the Classical Concert Society and used his influence in favour of the recognition of modern composers. At this time he met and became a close friend of Leonard Borwick, probably England's finest pianist at the time. In 1911 he visited Sydney and gave some concerts, and in 1912 took part in chamber music concerts in London. He performed with Pablo Casals, and he helped organise a concert in London by Maurice Ravel, on 17 December 1913 at the Bechstein Hall.At the concert, Kelly played four solo piano pieces by Alexander Scriabin and performed the Phantasy piano quintet by James Friskin, with the English String Quartet.

Following the outbreak of war in 1914, Kelly was commissioned into the Royal Naval Volunteer Reserve for service with the Royal Naval Division with his friends—the poet Rupert Brooke, the critic and composer William Denis Browne, and others of what became known as the Latin Club.

Kelly was wounded twice at Gallipoli, where he was awarded the Distinguished Service Cross and reached the rank of lieutenant-commander. At Gallipoli he wrote his scores in his tent at base camp, including his tribute to Brooke, Elegy for String Orchestra: "In Memoriam Rupert Brooke" (1915), conceived in the wake of Brooke's death. Kelly was among the party who buried him on Skyros.

The following is a description of Kelly's close connection to Brooke, taken from
Race Against Time: the Diaries of F.S. Kelly:

Kelly survived the Gallipoli slaughter, only to die at Beaucourt-sur-l'Ancre, France, when rushing a German machine gun post in the last days of the Battle of the Somme in November 1916. He lies in Martinsart's British Cemetery not far from where he fell at the age of 35. Of the dozen composers killed at the Somme, Kelly is the only one to have a marked grave; as a mark of the respect they accorded him, his men had retrieved his body and carried it back through No Man's Land.

Posthumous renown
Kelly's final piece was the Somme Lament, completed in October 1916, just two weeks before he died during the Somme campaign. It was completed in piano score. Christopher Latham orchestrated the work for a 2020 recording. At the memorial concert held at the Wigmore Hall, London on 2 May 1919, some of his piano compositions were played by Leonard Borwick, and some of his songs were sung by Muriel Foster. The centrepiece of the concert was the Elegy for String Orchestra, written at Gallipoli in memory of Rupert Brooke, a work of profound feeling. Frank Bridge was the conductor – he had conducted its first performance at Rugby School on 28 March 1916.

Kelly's "Serenade for Flute" with accompaniment of Harp, Horn, and String Orchestra (Op. 7), written in 1911, received its first recording 100 years after he composed it, by the Canadian flautist Rebecca Hall, who recorded it for CD label Cameo Classics. José Garcia Gutierrez was the horn soloist, with the Malta Philharmonic Orchestra conducted by its Musical Director, Michael Laus.

His piano works include the 12 Studies, Op. 9 (1907–13) and 24 Monographs, Op. 11 (1911–16) in all the major and minor keys, as well as a set of etudes, modelled on Chopin and Scriabin. The Preludes and Monographs have been recorded on Toccata 0524 by Alex Wilson.

Unmarried, he had lived at his home Bisham Grange, near Marlow, Buckinghamshire, with his sister Mary (Maisie). There is a memorial to him in the village of Bisham.

His elder brother, William Henry "Willie" Kelly, was a politician who held the seat of Wentworth in the Australian House of Representatives from 1903 to 1919.

His papers are held in the National Library of Australia.

Compositions 
 Two Songs, Op. 1 (1902)
 Aghadoe, an Irish Ballad for contralto and orchestra (edited by Richard Divall)
 Waltz-Pageant, Op. 2, for piano; arranged for two pianos (1905, rev. 1911)
 Allegro de concert, Op. 3, for piano (1907)
 A Cycle of Lyrics, Op. 4, for piano (1908)
 Theme, Variations and Fugue, Op. 5, for two pianos (1907–11)
 Six Songs, Op. 6 (1910–13)
 Serenade in E minor, Op. 7, for flute with accompaniment of harp, horn and string orchestra (1911). (This has been recorded by Rebecca Hall with the Malta Philharmonic Orchestra conducted by Michael Laus for Cameo Classics in 2011). Edited by Richard Divall 2014
 String Trio in B minor (1913–14). Edited by Richard Divall
 Piano Trio for violin, violoncello and piano in B-flat. Edited by Richard Divall
 Piece for horn, violin, viola and pianoforte. Edited by Richard Divall
 Movement for English horn and piano. Edited by Richard Divall
 Two Preludes for organ (1914) Published by Marshall-Hall Trust. Edited by Bruce Steele
 Elegy, In Memoriam Rupert Brooke for harp and strings (1915) Published by Marshall-Hall Trust. Edited by Richard Divall who has made a reduction of the work for String Quintet (2 violins, viola and 2 cellos).
 Violin Sonata in G major "Gallipoli" (1915) Edited by Richard Divall and Christopher Latham
 Violin Sonata in D minor, unfinished. Edited by Richard Divall
 Piano Sonata in F minor, unfinished (1916). Published by Marshall-Hall Trust. Edited by Richard Divall and Bruce Steele 2005
 12 Studies, Op. 9, for piano (1915). Published by Marshall-Hall Trust. Edited by Richard Divall and Bruce Steele 2005
 24 Monographs, Op. 11, for piano (1915). Published by Marshall-Hall Trust. Edited by Richard Divall and Bruce Steele 2005
 Intermezzo for Orchestra 1906. Edited by Richard Divall
 Five unpublished songs. Edited by Richard Divall

See also
 List of Olympians killed in World War I
 List of Oxford University Boat Race crews

Notes

References
 Kelly, F.S. (Radic, T., ed.), Race Against Time: The Diaries of F.S. Kelly, National Library of Australia, (Canberra), 2004.

External links
 One of us, even if he liked to be one of them – Alan Ramsey – www.smh.com.au at www.smh.com.au
 
 Name Kelly, Frederick Septimus Rank or Rating: Sub Lieutenant, Temporary full service record from The National Archives (fee required for download)

1881 births
1916 deaths
Rowers from Sydney
People educated at Eton College
Alumni of Balliol College, Oxford
Australian male rowers
Rowers at the 1908 Summer Olympics
Olympic rowers of Great Britain
Olympic gold medallists for Great Britain
Royal Naval Volunteer Reserve personnel of World War I
British military personnel killed in the Battle of the Somme
Australian recipients of the Distinguished Service Cross (United Kingdom)
Hoch Conservatory alumni
Royal Navy officers of World War I
Australian male composers
British composers
Olympic medalists in rowing
Australian people of Irish descent
British people of Irish descent
Members of Leander Club
Oxford University Boat Club rowers
Medalists at the 1908 Summer Olympics
Australian classical composers
20th-century British male musicians